Vijayaditya (696–733 CE)  followed his father, Vinayaditya on to the Chalukya throne.  His long reign was marked by general peace and prosperity.  Vijayaditya also built a number of temples.
He fought against the Pallavas and extracted tributes from Paramesvaravarman II. The Alupas of South Canara who were
loyal to the Chalukyas and led by Alupa Chitravahana, brother-in-law of Vijayaditya defeated a Pandyan invasion of Mangalore in 705.
Vijayaditya was succeeded by his son Vikramaditya II in 733. Vijayaditya ruled for 18 years.

Rule
Vijayaditya donated a village named Kadamma, located to the south of Purikaranagara, to Sankha-Jinendra temple at Lakshmeshwara, Gadag district in 730 CE.

References

Citations

Sources
 Dr. Suryanath U. Kamat (2001). Concise History of Karnataka, MCC, Bangalore (Reprinted 2002).
 Nilakanta Sastri, K.A. (1935). The CōĻas, University of Madras, Madras (Reprinted 1984).
 Nilakanta Sastri, K.A. (1955). A History of South India, OUP, New Delhi (Reprinted 2002).
 
 South Indian Inscriptions - http://www.whatisindia.com/inscriptions/
  History of Karnataka, Mr. Arthikaje

Early Chalukyas
696 births
733 deaths
7th-century Indian monarchs
8th-century Indian monarchs